Suraj Bhanu Solanki (4 April 1960 – 21 March 2021) was an Indian politician. He was elected to the lower House of Parliament the Lok Sabha from Dhar, Madhya Pradesh as a member of the Indian National Congress.

Solanti died from a heart attack on 21 March 2021, aged 60.

References

External links
 Official biographical sketch in Parliament of India website

India MPs 1989–1991
India MPs 1991–1996
Indian National Congress politicians
Politicians from Bhopal
1960 births
2021 deaths
Indian National Congress politicians from Madhya Pradesh